George Hay may refer to:
George Hay, 7th Earl of Erroll (1508–1573), Scottish nobleman and politician
George Hay (Virginia judge) (1765–1830), United States politician and judge
George Hay (politician) (1715–1778), Member of Parliament and Dean of the Arches
George Hay (bishop) (1729–1811), Vicar Apostolic of Lowland Scotland
George Hay (ice hockey) (1898–1975), Canadian hockey forward
George Hay (minister) (c.1530–1588), Church of Scotland minister
George D. Hay (1895–1968), country music pioneer
George Hay (writer), founder of the Science Fiction Foundation
George Hay, 1st Earl of Kinnoull (1570–1634), Lord Chancellor of Scotland
George Hay, 2nd Earl of Kinnoull (1596–1644), Scottish peer, military officer, and political official
George Hay, 3rd Earl of Kinnoull (died 1650), Scottish peer and military officer
George Hay, 5th Earl of Kinnoull (died 1687), Scottish peer and soldier
George Hay, 8th Earl of Kinnoull (1689–1758)
George Hay, 7th Marquess of Tweeddale (1753–1804), Scottish peer
George Hay, 12th Earl of Kinnoull (1827–1897)
George Hay, 14th Earl of Kinnoull (1902–1938), Scottish peer
George Hay, 8th Marquess of Tweeddale (1787–1876), British field marshal
George Hay, fictional character in the play Moon Over Buffalo
George Hay (cricketer) (1851–1913), English cricketer who played for Derbyshire, 1875–1886
George Hay (footballer)  1930s, Scottish footballer for Third Lanark and Queen of the South
George Campbell Hay (1915–1984), Scottish poet
George Hay, Earl of Gifford (1822–1862), British Liberal Party politician

See also
George Hays (disambiguation)
George Hayes (disambiguation)